Hailakandi Assembly constituency is one of the 126 constituencies of the Legislative Assembly of Assam state in northeastern India.

Hailakandi (constituency number 6) is one of the 3 constituencies located in Hailakandi district. Hailakandi is part of Karimganj Lok Sabha constituency along with 7 other assembly segments, namely, Katlichera and Algapur in Hailakandi district, and Patharkandi, Karimganj North, Karimganj South, Ratabari and Badarpur in Karimganj district.

Members of Legislative Assembly
 1952: Abdul Matlib Mazumder, Indian National Congress
 1957: Abdul Matlib Mazumder, Indian National Congress
 1962: Rampirit Rudrapaul, Independent
 1967: Abdul Matlib Mazumder, Indian National Congress
 1972: Abdur Rahman Chowdhury. 
 1978: Dipak Bhattacharjee
 1983: Abdul Muhib Mazumder, Indian National Congress
 1985: Abdul Muhib Mazumdar, Indian National Congress. 
 1991: Chittendra Nath Mazumder, Bharatiya Janata Party
 1996: Abdul Muhib Majumder, Independent
 2001: Sahab Uddin Choudhury, Independent
 2006: Hazi Salim Uddin Barbhuiya, All India United Democratic Front
 2011: Abdul Muhib Mazumder, Indian National Congress
 2016: Anwar Hussain Laskar, All India United Democratic Front
2021:Zakir Hussain Laskar, All India United Democratic Front

Election results

2016 result

See also
 Hailakandi
 List of constituencies of Assam Legislative Assembly

References

External links 
 

Assembly constituencies of Assam
Hailakandi district